The 1996 South Australian National Football League (SANFL) Grand Final saw the Port Adelaide Magpies defeat the Central District Bulldogs by 36 points. The match was played on Sunday 6 October 1996 at Football Park in front of a crowd of 46,120.
 As of the 2020 SANFL Grand Final, this is the highest attendance for an SANFL Grand Final since the first year of the Adelaide Crows in the AFL (1991).

This was Port Adelaide's 34th premiership, third premiership in a row, and seventh in nine years. Port would also go on to win in 1998 and 1999.

Port had also beaten Central District in the 1995 Grand Final. Thirteen Port players from the 1995 grand final also played in the 1996 grand final.  For Central District, 12 players played in both.

Central District entered the Grand Final as favourite to win as they were minor premiers (first on the ladder prior to the finals) and had beaten Port on all four occasions that the teams had met in 1996 prior to the grand final.

Match Summary

Jack Oatey Medal 
The Jack Oatey Medal for best player in the Grand Final was awarded to David Brown of Port Adelaide.  However, The Advertiser (Adelaide) newspaper judged Fabian Francis as the best player on the ground.

Teams
Port Adelaide was captained by Tim Ginever and coached by Stephen Williams.  Williams had taken over from John Cahill part way through the season when Cahill joined the newly formed Port Adelaide Power. Central District was captained by Roger Girdham and coached by Steve Wright.

Umpires 
The game was umpired by Richard Williams, Michael Avon, and Troy Burton.

Scorecard

Port Adelaide entrance into the AFL 

1996 marked the end of an era for Port Adelaide being their last year their senior most team played in the SANFL, as the Port Adelaide Football Club started fielding a side the AFL from 1997 onwards.

The Power's inaugural squad included eight players from the 1996 Port Adelaide SANFL premiership team, including Warren Tredrea, Scott Hodges, Michael Wilson, Fabian Francis, Stephen Carter, Darren Mead, David Brown and Nigel Fiegert. 

Fellow Magpies Darryl Poole (who missed the Grand Final via suspension), Peter Burgoyne, Tom Carr, Paul Evans and Jason Dylan (rookie list) would round out the homegrown picks. They would be joined by former Magpies returning from other AFL clubs including inaugural captain Gavin Wanganeen, Brayden Lyle and Shane Bond.

Central District would supply the Power with two players from their defeated Grand Final team, Jarrod Cotton and Mark Conway, and juniors Stuart Dew and Nathan Steinberner.

External links 
 Port Adelaide Magpies Official Website
 Central District Football Club Official Website
 SANFL Official Website

References 

SANFL Grand Finals
Sanfl Grand Final, 1996